John Thirlwell Dodds (1885–1940) was an English professional footballer who played as a forward in the Football League for Oldham Athletic and Newcastle United.

Personal life 
Dodds enlisted as a private in the Football Battalion of the Middlesex Regiment during the First World War. He later served in the Labour Corps.

Career statistics

Honours 
Merthyr Town

 Southern League Second Division: 1911–12
 South Wales Cup: 1911–12

References

1885 births
Sportspeople from Hexham
Footballers from Northumberland
English footballers
English Football League players
Association football outside forwards
Association football inside forwards
Royal Pioneer Corps soldiers
British Army personnel of World War I
Middlesex Regiment soldiers
Newcastle United F.C. players
Oldham Athletic A.F.C. players
Heart of Midlothian F.C. wartime guest players
Darlington F.C. players
Merthyr Town F.C. players
Stalybridge Celtic F.C. players
1940 deaths

Southern Football League players